Conservatism in New Zealand, though related to its counterparts in other Western countries,  developed uniquely over time. Advocates followed a political ideology that emphasised the preservation of traditional European beliefs, institutions and practices.

History

Origins
Initially conservatism was a philosophy used by the "men in possession" of a new country, but most of all it espoused the spirits of individualism akin to Herbert Spencer's theories. Prior to the mid-1870s, New Zealand's political factions were based less on ideologies and more on provincial allegiances. This was to change however, with members of parliament becoming more identifiable as one of two groups—"Conservative" or "Liberal"—akin to Britain. The labels often walked hand in hand with each MP's stance on land policy. Nearly all those calling themselves conservatives supported freehold policy, while those labelled as liberals advocated for leasehold legislature.

From 1876 to 1890 the conservative factions dominated the House of Representatives. The so-called "Continuous Ministry" governed almost this whole period, with two breaks from October 1877 to October 1879 and August 1884 to October 1887, when "Liberal" ministries were formed under George Grey and Robert Stout, respectively. The Continuous Ministry was governing once again in 1887–88, the worst years of the Long Depression, when Premier Harry Atkinson became very unpopular, even with the wealthy his erstwhile supporters. An ailing Atkinson resigned and a new ministry was formed under John Ballance and his recently formed Liberal Party.

Opposition to the Liberals
The beginning of party politics in New Zealand was a setback for conservative-oriented politicians, worsened by the accession of the immensely popular Richard Seddon to the premiership. His opponents struggled to set up an equivalent full-scale organisation in competition to the Liberal Party. The conservatives struggled to contrast with appeal against Seddon and his Liberal political vehicle. William Pember Reeves, when asked of what differentiated the Conservatives from the Liberals in parliament, phrased them as "parties of resistance and progress" respectively.

Atkinson had some respite, stacking the Legislative Council with fellow conservatives, to control the Liberals from the upper house (often compared to the period 1906–11 in Britain where the Liberal government was blocked by peers in the House of Lords). Ballance eventually got his way with the Governor General by limiting the term of a MLC from life to seven years. However, the Liberals were not able to fully claim the upper house from the Conservatives until 1899. The beginning of the 1900s was the weakest point in New Zealand conservatism. Helped by jingoism in the Second Boer War, Seddon was at the height of his power, reigning supreme over parliament. By contrast, the Conservatives were disorganised, demoralised and, by 1901, leaderless. In 1902 a Sydney newspaper said of the Conservatives:

They have hardly [in 12 years] carried even a snatch division on a question about a culvert on a back country road. They could hardly remember how to draft a bill now, and they have forgotten what success looks like.

The Conservatives began to improve, with many initial supporters of the Liberals now defecting upon having now received the reforms they wanted in the 1890s. Of further aid to the Conservative cause was the emergence of independent Labour parties who were leeching away supporters from the Liberals, particularly in cities.

The Reform Party
In February 1909 Massey announced the formation of the Reform Party, New Zealand's first true right-wing political party, in his attempts to establish a credible vision to there being a possible alternative government to challenge the long established Liberal dominance. The name "Reform" was not new, but it served its purpose to efface the "Conservative" branding and party-image with which Massey's supporters were viewed.

Massey became Prime Minister and formed the first non-Liberal government in 21 years.

Leaders
Below is a list of the leading figures among the right wing members of parliament from the forming of the Continuous Ministry until the establishment of the Reform Party.

Key

See also

 Historic liberalism in New Zealand
 History of New Zealand
 Politics of New Zealand
 List of political parties in New Zealand

Notes

References

Further reading

 
Political movements in New Zealand